Otto Thomas Solbrig (born 21 December 1930 in Buenos Aires) is an Argentinian evolutionary biologist and botanist. His research deals with ecology and biodiversity of the Argentine and Uruguayan Pampas, Cerrado and sustainable agriculture.

Career
In 1954, he received a biology degree at National University of La Plata and in 1959, he obtained a PhD in botany at University of California, Berkeley. He is now an emeritus professor of biology at Harvard University

Awards
 1969 : Master Honoris Causa from Harvard University, 1969
 1975 : Guggenheim Fellowship
 1991 : Extraordinary professor honoris causa, faculty of agronomy, National University of La Plata
 1993 : Distinguished Professor honoris causa, National University of Mar del Plata
 1995 : Professor honorario honoris causa, Faculty of philosophy, University of Buenos Aires
 1995 : Fellow of The World Academy of Sciences
 1997 : Doctor in agronomy honoris causa, National University of Lomas de Zamora
 1998 : International Prize for Biology

References

Botanists with author abbreviations
1930 births
Argentine people of German descent
20th-century Argentine botanists
Scientists from Buenos Aires
Argentine emigrants to the United States
Living people